Devil You Know may refer to:

 "Devil You Know" (song), a 1982 single by New Zealand band DD Smash
 Light the Torch, an American heavy metal group formerly known as Devil You Know
 Devil You Know, a novel by Cathy MacPhail, shortlisted for the 2015 Hampshire Book Awards

See also
 The Devil You Know (disambiguation)